Andrei Popescu (born 1948) is a Romanian lawyer and a judge at the General Court of the European Union.

He graduated in law from the University of Bucharest in 1971 and obtained his doctorate (Doctor in Laws) in 1980. From 1971 to 1973 he was trainee assistant lecturer; from 1974 to 1985 he was a tenured assistant lecturer  and from 1985 to 1990 he was a lecturer in labour law at the University of Bucharest. From 1991 to 1991 he was a principal researcher at the National Research Institute for Labour and Social Protection. In 1991 he became  Deputy Director at the  Ministry of Labour and Social Protection and was Director from 1992 to 1996. From 1997 he was a senior lecturer at the National School of Political Science and Public Administration in Bucharest, becoming a professor in 2000. From 2001 to 2005, he was State Secretary at the Ministry for European Integration (2001–05). From 1996 to 2001 and from 2005 to 2009, he was also Head of Department at the Legislative Council of Romania.

He was founding editor of the Romanian Review of European Law, and President of the Romanian Society for European Law from 2009 to 2010.

From 2009 to 2010 he was agent of the Romanian Government before the Courts of the European Union, and since 26 November 2010 he has been a judge at the General Court of the European Union.

References

1948 births
Living people
University of Bucharest alumni
Academic staff of the University of Bucharest
21st-century Romanian judges
General Court (European Union) judges
Romanian judges of international courts and tribunals
Romanian officials of the European Union